Epsom and Ewell Borough Council is elected every four years. It is notable for its long-standing control by a Residents' Association rather than one of the national political parties.

Political control

Leadership
The role of mayor is largely ceremonial at Epsom and Ewell Borough Council. The council does not appoint a leader of the council, with political leadership instead being provided by the chair of the strategy and resources committee, with some leadership functions separately being undertaken by the chair of the majority group, the Residents Associations of Epsom and Ewell. Since 2015 the chairs of the strategy and resources committee have been:

The chairs of the majority group over the same period have been:

Composition since 1955

Council elections
1973 Epsom and Ewell Borough Council election
1976 Epsom and Ewell Borough Council election (New ward boundaries)
1979 Epsom and Ewell Borough Council election
1983 Epsom and Ewell Borough Council election
1987 Epsom and Ewell Borough Council election
1991 Epsom and Ewell Borough Council election
1995 Epsom and Ewell Borough Council election (Borough boundary changes took place but the number of seats remained the same)
1999 Epsom and Ewell Borough Council election
2003 Epsom and Ewell Borough Council election (New ward boundaries)
2007 Epsom and Ewell Borough Council election
2011 Epsom and Ewell Borough Council election
2015 Epsom and Ewell Borough Council election
2019 Epsom and Ewell Borough Council election

By-election results

External links
Epsom and Ewell Borough Council

 
Council elections in Surrey